The Ministry of Technology is the cabinet ministry of the Government of Sri Lanka that directs the formulation and implementation of policies related to implementation, regulation and growth of technology and scientific research in the country.

List of ministers

The Minister of Technology is an appointment in the Cabinet of Sri Lanka. 
Parties

See also
List of universities in Sri Lanka
Research in Sri Lanka

References

External links 
 
 Government of Sri Lanka

Technology
Science and technology in Sri Lanka
Sri Lanka